The Rugby League World Cup is an international men's rugby league competition contested every several years between national teams of the members of International Rugby League, the sport's governing body. Australia has won the most Rugby League World Cup championships, with its twelfth coming in the 2021 tournament in England, in which it defeated Samoa.

List of Finals

Team performance

See also

Notes

References

External links
World Cup

 
Rugby league-related lists